Hunar Hali Gandhi (born 9 September 1989) is an Indian television actress. She is known for playing the lead role of Aditi Jaiswal in Chhal — Sheh Aur Maat, Nandini in Ek Boond Ishq on Life OK, and Lovely in Thapki Pyaar Ki.

Early life
Hale was born on 9 September 1989 in Delhi, India to a Sikh family. 
She has a brother named Prince Siali. 
Hali did her schooling from Mount Carmel School, Anand Niketan, Delhi and later completed a degree in Bachelor of Mass Media (B.M.M.) from Mumbai University. 
Her father Bikram Jeet Singh died on 14 February 2010, which is why she never celebrates Valentine’s Day.

Career
Hale made her television debut with Star Plus show Kahaani Ghar Ghar Kii in 2007. After that she did Grihasti as Soni Khuraana on Star Plus. She was last seen as Lovely in Thapki Pyar Ki on Colors TV.

She has also worked in popular tv serials like Sasural Genda Phool, Mukti Bandhan, Dahleez and Ek Boond Ishq.
Hule played the role of lead actress for the first time in the TV show Chhal — Sheh Aur Maat.
Apart from television, she is also active in the film industry. In 2013, she appeared in the role of Dimple in Akshay Kumar’s film Boss.

Personal life

Hali married Mayank Gandhi on 28 August 2016 in Delhi. Mayank and Hunar met each other through their families. They had a roka ceremony in the earlier 2016. They became engaged in Delhi, followed by the pre-wedding functions which included mehendi and sangeet ceremonies, and a cocktail party, all of which took place on 26th and 27th August. They were married in a simple ceremony in the Gurdwara.

Television

Films

References

External links

 
 

Living people
Indian television actresses
Indian soap opera actresses
1989 births